Synodontis steindachneri  is a species of upside-down catfish endemic to Cameroon where it occurs in the Nyong River.  This species grows to a length of  TL.

References

External links 

steindachneri
Freshwater fish of Africa
Fish of Cameroon
Endemic fauna of Cameroon
Taxa named by George Albert Boulenger
Fish described in 1913